Michael M. Sears (born July 16, 1947) is an American former Boeing executive and convicted felon.

In 1992 Sears led the successful development of the F/A-18E/F Super Hornet. In 1997, Sears was President of the Douglas Aircraft Company division of McDonnell Douglas. In 2003, Sears was Boeing's CFO.

Boeing terminated Sears on November 24, 2003 as the result of corruption allegations relating to the improper hiring of Darleen Druyun. For his part in the Darleen Druyun scandal, Sears was sentenced to four months in prison, a $250,000 fine, and 200 hours of community service.

See also 

 United States Air Force tanker contract controversy

References

Department of Justice news release about Sears's sentencing

Living people
1947 births
American electronics engineers
American aerospace businesspeople
American aerospace engineers
American people convicted of fraud
American businesspeople convicted of crimes
American chief financial officers
Missouri University of Science and Technology alumni